Hemelsoet is a surname. Notable people with the surname include:

 Joseph Hemelsoet (1905–?), Belgian racing cyclist
 Maurice Hemelsoet (1875–1943), Belgian rower and Olympian

Surnames of Belgian origin